Florence Elizabeth, Lady Barrett,  (1867 - 7 August 1945) was a consultant surgeon at the Mothers' Hospital in Clapton and the Royal Free Hospital in London. She was a gynaecologist, obstetrician and eugenecist.

Early and private life
Lady Barrett was born in Henbury in Gloucestershire now part of Bristol, and she was the fourth child of merchant Benjamin Perry. She received little formal education in the early part of her life, she studied physiology and organic chemistry at University College, Bristol, and graduated with a first-class BSc in 1895. She received a Bachelor of Medicine (MB) in 1900 and a Doctor of Medicine (MD) in 1906 at the London School of Medicine for Women.

Barrett married surgeon Frederick George Ingor Willey, the son of Josiah Willey FRCS, in 1896.

In 1916, Barrett married Sir William Fletcher Barrett FRS. At the time of their marriage, Sir William, aged 72, was a former Professor of Physics at the Royal College of Science for Ireland in Dublin. His research focused on psychic phenomena, and he later founded the Society for Psychical Research in 1882. She claimed to have conversed with her husband after his death in 1925 through the help of a third-party. She published an account of the sittings, entitled Personality Survives Death, in 1937.

Medical career
Barrett joined the staff of the Royal Free Hospital in 1906, which was the only hospital in England where women could train in medical practice at the time. Before World War I, she developed voluntary centres for the feeding of expectant mothers and children. She was an obstetric surgeon at the Mothers' Hospital from 1913, and an obstetric and gynaecological surgeon at the Royal Free Hospital. Barrett worked there as a surgeon at a time when operations were at their peak.

In 1916, Barrett led a fund-raising campaign to extend the hospital, adding maternity, paediatric and infant welfare facilities. She helped to develop the London School of Medicine for Women at the Royal Free Hospital, of which she became Dean and then President in 1937.

Barrett was an active member of the Eugenics Society, and served on its council from 1917. Barrett advocated for "state interference" in the sex lives of "the unfit" to implement birth control, because she believed that propaganda would be ineffective. Barrett felt that contraception should be overseen by the medical profession and expressed preference for abstinence over contraception in for "normal healthy individuals". She preferred to recommend the use of the rhythm method and condoms over other methods.

In 1921, Barrett and other members of the Medical Women's Federation protested the decisions of Glasgow and St Pancras councils to refuse to employ medical women who were married and whose husbands had jobs, arguing that this contravened the Sex Disqualification (Removal) Act 1919.

Barrett served as president of the Medical Women's Federation in 1923, and joint vice-president of the Obstetrics and Gynaecology Section of the British Medical Association. She was also a Fellow of the Royal Society of Medicine and president of the Medical Women's International Association.

Later life
She was appointed as a CBE in the first list of awards for the Order of the British Empire in 1917, and became a Companion of Honour in 1929.

She died in Maidenhead, and a memorial service was held at St Martin-in-the-Fields. Her obituary in The Times stated "She was unquestionably one of the most distinguished of medical women". She left her husband’s library to the Society for Psychical Research, and also left £1,000 to endow a scholarship at the London School of Medicine for Women.

References

1867 births
1945 deaths
Alumni of the London School of Medicine for Women
Alumni of the University of Bristol
British gynaecologists
British obstetricians
Medical doctors from Bristol
Parapsychologists
Presidents of the Medical Women's Federation
British eugenicists